The 2009–10 Bayer 04 Leverkusen season happened between 31 July 2009 and 8 May 2010. Bayer Leverkusen participated in the Bundesliga and DFB-Pokal.

Season overview

August
Bayer Leverkusen started the 2009–10 season on 31 July 2009 in the DFB-Pokal. Bayer Leverkusen defeated SV Babelsberg 1–0 in the first round on 31 July 2009. Eren Derdiyok scored the only goal of the match. Bayer Leverkusen's opening match of the Bundesliga happened on 8 August 2009 against 1. FSV Mainz 05. The match finished in a 2–2 draw. Eren Derdiyok and Stefan Kießling scored for Bayer Leverkusen. Tim Hoogland and Daniel Gunkel scored for Mainz. Bayer Leverkusen finished matchday one tied for eighth place. Matchday two happened on 15 August 2009 against 1899 Hoffenheim. Bayer Leverkusen won 1–0 with a goal from Stefan Kießling. Bayer Leverkusen finished matchday two in sixth place. Matchday three happened on 22 August 2009 against SC Freiburg. Bayer Leverkusen won the match 5–0. Eren Derdiyok scored two goals, Tranquillo Barnetta scored two goals, and Stefan Kießling scored a goal. Bayer Leverkusen finished matchday three in first place. Matchday four happened on 29 August 2009 against VfL Bochum. Bayer Leverkusen won 2–1. Manuel Friedrich and Stefan Kießling scored for Bayer Leverkusen. Bochum's goal came from an own goal from Manuel Friedrich. Bayer Leverkusen finished matchday four in second place.

September

Matchday five happened on 12 September 2009 against VfL Wolfsburg. Bayer Leverkusen won 3–2. Simon Rolfes and Stefan Kießling scored for Bayer Leverkusen. Rolfes scored two goals, including one from the penalty spot. Wolfsburg got goals from Zvjezdan Misimović and Grafite, who scored from the penalty spot. Bayer Leverkusen striker Eren Derdiyok and Wolfsburg goalkeeper Diego Benaglio were sent-off. Bayer Leverkusen finished matchday five in second place. Matchday six happened on 20 September 2009 against Werder Bremen. The match finished in a 0–0 draw. After matchday six, Bayer Leverkusen were in second place. On 23 September 2009, Bayer Leverkusen were defeated 2–1 by 1. FC Kaiserslautern in the second round of the DFB-Pokal. Kaiserslautern took a 2–0 lead with goals from Sidney Sam and Erik Jendrišek. Theofanis Gekas scored late in the match to pull a goal back for Bayer Leverkusen. Matchday seven happened on 26 September 2009 against 1. FC Köln. Bayer Leverkusen won 1–0 with a goal from Simon Rolfes. Köln midfielder Maniche was sent-off during the match. Bayer Leverkusen finished matchday seven in second place.

October
Matchday eight happened on 3 October 2009 against 1. FC Nürnberg. Bayer Leverkusen won 4–0 with goals from Toni Kroos, Simon Rolfes, Eren Derdiyok, and Stefan Kießling. Bayer Leverkusen finished matchday eight in first place. Matchday nine happened on 17 October 2009 against Hamburger SV. The match finished in a 0–0 draw. After matchday nine, Bayer Leverkusen were in first place. Matchday 10 happened on 23 October 2009 against Borussia Dortmund. The match finished 1–1. Manuel Friedrich scored for Bayer Leverkusen and Lucas Barrios scored for Borussia Dortmund. Bayer Leverkusen finished matchday 10 in first place. Matchday 11 happened on 31 October 2009 against FC Schalke. The match finished in a 2–2 draw. Toni Kroos and Stefan Kießling scored for Bayer Leverkusen and Kevin Kuranyi and Vicente Sánchez scored for Schalke. Bayer Leverkusen finished matchday 11 in first place.

November
Matchday 12 happened on 6 November 2009 against Eintracht Frankfurt. Bayer Leverkusen won 4–0 with goals from Stefan Kießling, Stefan Reinartz, Toni Kroos, and Lars Bender. Bayer Leverkusen finished matchday 12 in first place. Matchday 13 happened on 22 November 2009 against Bayern Munich. The match finished in a 1–1 draw. Stefan Kießling scored for Bayer Leverkusen and Mario Gómez scored for Bayern Munich. Bayer Leverkusen finished matchday 13 in first place. Matchday 14 happened on 29 November 2009 against VfB Stuttgart. Bayer Leverkusen won 4–0 with three goals from Stefan Kießling and a goal from Eren Derdiyok. Bayer Leverkusen finished matchday 14 in first place.

December and January
Matchday 15 happened on 5 December 2009 against Hannover 96. The match finished in a 0–0 draw. Bayer Leverkusen finished matchday 15 in first place. Matchday 16 happened on 11 December 2009 against Hertha BSC. The match finished in a 2–2 draw. Toni Kroos and Burak Kaplan scored for Bayer Leverkusen. Adrián Ramos scored two goals for Hertha BSC. Gojko Kacar was sent-off during the match. Bayer Leverkusen finished matchday 16 in first place. Matchday 17 happened on 19 December 2009 against Borussia Mönchengladbach. Bayer Leverkusen won the match 3–2. Bayer Leverkusen got two goals from Toni Kroos and a goal from Eren Derdiyok. Roel Brouwers and Dante scored for Borussia Mönchengladbach. Bayer Leverkusen finished matchday 17 in first place. Matchday 18 happened on 16 January 2010 against Mainz. Bayer Leverkusen won 4–2. Michal Kadlec, Tranquillo Barnetta, Toni Kroos, and Eren Derdiyok scored for Bayer Leverkusen. Tim Hoogland and Niko Bungert scored for Mainz. Bayer Leverkusen finished matchday 18 in first place. Matchday 19 happened on 24 January 2010 against 1899 Hoffenheim. Bayer Leverkusen won 3–0 with goals from Sami Hyypiä, Toni Kroos, and Tranquillo Barnetta. Bayer Leverkusen finished matchday 19 in first place. Matchday 20 happened on 31 January 2010 against Freiburg. Bayer Leverkusen won 3–1. Stefan Kießling, Eren Derdiyok, and Sami Hyypiä scored for Bayer Leverkusen. Felix Bastians scored for Freiburg. Bayer Leverkusen finished matchday 20 in first place.

February
Matchday 21 happened on 6 February 2010 against Bochum. The match finished in a 1–1 draw. Eren Derdiyok scored for Bayer Leverkusen. Zlatko Dedić scored for Bochum. Bayer Leverkusen finished matchday 21 in first place. Matchday 22 happened on 13 February 2010 against Wolfsburg. Bayer Leverkusen 2–1. Bayer Leverkusen finished matchday 22 in first place. Matchday 23 happened on 21 February 2010 against Werder Bremen. The match finished in a 2–2 draw. Eren Derdiyok and Toni Kroos scored for Bayer Leverkusen. Claudio Pizarro and Per Mertesacker scored for Werder Bremen. Bayer Leverkusen finished matchday 23 in first place. Matchday 24 happened on 27 February 2010 against Köln. The match finished in a 0–0 draw. Bayer Leverkusen finished matchday 24 in second place.

March
Matchday 25 happened on 7 March 2010 against Nürnberg. Bayer Leverkusen lost the match 3–2. This was Bayer Leverkusen's first loss of the season. Stefan Kießling and Patrick Helmes scored for Bayer Leverkusen. Nürnberg got two goals from Eric Maxim Choupo-Moting and a goal from Mickaël Tavares. Bayer Leverkusen finished matchday 25 in third place. Matchday 26 happened on 14 March 2010 against Hamburg. Bayer Leverkusen won the match 4–2. Bayer Leverkusen got two goals from Stefan Kießling, a goal from Eren Derdiyok, and a goal from Gonzalo Castro. Zé Roberto and David Rozehnal scored for Hamburg. Bayer Leverkusen finished matchday 26 in third place. Matchday 27 happened on 20 March 2010 against Borussia Dortmund. Borussia Dortmund won the match 3–0 with two goals from Lucas Barrios and a goal from Dimitar Rangelov. Bayer Leverkusen finished matchday 27 in third place. Matchday 28 happened on 27 March 2010 against Schalke. Schalke won 2–0 with two goals by Kevin Kuranyi. Bayer Leverkusen finished matchday 28 in third place.

April and May
Matchday 29 happened on 3 April 2010 against Eintracht Frankfurt. Bayer Leverkusen lost 3–2. Stefan Kießling scored twice for Bayer Leverkusen. Eintracht Frankfurt got goals from Selim Teber, who scored from the penalty spot; Caio; and Maik Franz. Daniel Schwaab was sent-off during the match. Bayer Leverkusen finished matchday 29 in third place. Matchday 30 happened on 10 April 2010 against Bayern Munich. The match finished in a 1–1 draw. Arturo Vidal scored for Bayer Leverkusen and Arjen Robben scored for Bayern Munich. Bayer Leverkusen finished matchday 30 in third place. Matchday 31 happened on 17 April 2010 against Stuttgart. Bayer Leverkusen lost the match 2–1. Stefan Kießling scored for Bayer Leverkusen and Cacau scored two goals for Stuttgart. Tranquillo Barnetta was sent-off during the match. Bayer Leverkusen finished matchday 31 in fourth place. Matchday 32 happened on 24 April 2010 against Hannover. Bayer Leverkusen won the match 3–0 with two goals from Stefan Kießling and a goal from Burak Kaplan. Bayer Leverkusen finished matchday 32 in fourth place. Matchday 33 happened on 1 May 2010 against Hertha BSC. The match finished in a 1–1 draw. Manuel Friedrich scored for Bayer Leverkusen and Raffael scored for Hertha BSC. Bayer Leverkusen finished the matchday 33 in fourth place. Matchday 34, the final matchday, happened on 8 May 2010 against Borussia Mönchengladbach. The match finished in a 1–1 draw. Patrick Helmes scored for Bayer Leverkusen and Roel Brouwers scored for Borussia Mönchengladbach. Bayer Leverkusen finished the league season in fourth place.

Competitive matches

Bundesliga

Results summary

Bundesliga results

DFB-Pokal

Squad statistics

Appearances and goals

|}

Bookings

References

Notes

Bayer 04 Leverkusen seasons
Bayer Leverkusen